The Yoroiden-Samurai Troopers CD Dramas (鎧伝サムライトルーパー) (Ronin Warriors) take place in the second season of the TV series Yoroiden-Samurai Troopers. 

During YST's run in the late 1980s and early 1990s, countless merchandise was produced by Sunrise Animation Studio and other supporting companies. Some of these included doujinshi, novels, compact discs, and cassette tapes that involve the Troopers in off-screen action (i.e. not shown on television). The most notable off-screen adventures take place within the drama CDs that were released. Four of these CDs center around the four Samurai Troopers that aid Rekka no Ryo (Ryo of the Wildfire) in his quest to fight evil. As Ryo is the main protagonist of the series, these CDs take a much closer look at his friends and their backgrounds.

Tenkūden
Tenkūden (The Legend of Tenkū) is the CD drama that focuses on Tenkū no Tōma (Rowen of the Strata) and introduces fans to his parents (mainly his mother), and how he feels around his friends and family. It also introduces Garyūda, a demon from the Yōjakai (Nether World) who wishes to get Arago's attention. 
Garyūda disrupts a plane in mid-flight that obtained many passengers inside, including Tōma's mother. The Troopers couldn't do anything on the ground and their only hope was Tōma, whose abilities blossom and enables him to actually fly. He is able to defeat Garyūda with his super attack move and save his mother's life.

Kōrinden
Kōrinden (The Legend of Kōrin) is the CD drama focusing on Kōrin no Seiji (Sage of the Halo). It reveals a darker side to Seiji, as he feels that being around the Troopers when not in battle would only lead to more battles. So he chooses to stay away from them and focus on his life. But a car accident sends Seiji to the hospital and fighting for his life. Fortunately his friends somehow reach through to him and help him pull out of his weakened state. Through this he learns that no matter what, he can trust his friends whether they are in battle or not.

Seiji's background is revealed to fans, as the drama takes place in the Date dojo.

Suikoden
Suikoden (The Legend of Suiko) is Suiko no Shin's (Cye of the Torrent) CD drama. Unlike the previous two CDs, only Ryo, Seiji, and Shin are featured as the main characters. A new villain is introduced: The Ice Warlord Toryūki. Ryo, Seiji, and Shin take a train to a woodland attraction where a great lake sat. It is there they encounter Toryūki and experience first hand his icy wrath. Unlike other demons the Troopers fought, Toryūki is a demon who lives in the Ningenkai (Mortal World) and dislikes Arago. Ryo and Seiji are frozen by Toryūki's powers. Shin struggles against his new opponent and it isn't until he is able to power himself and his abilities that he is able to defeat him. Toryūki's super attack move was no match for Shin's and was defeated—Ryo and Seiji were also freed at this point. Toryūki is one of the few redeemable villains in the series, as he expresses his love for his land and wishes for its beauty to not be destroyed. He vanishes and is never seen again.

Tsuki
Tsuki (Moon) is Kongō no Shū's (Kento of Hardrock) CD drama. It arrived much later in production (during the time that the Message OVA was released) compared to the other dramas. And unlike the others, Tsuki features the three remaining Mashō (Dark Warlords). The new opponent is named Gōgasha, a demon who has an eye for being the new leader of the Four Mashō, something that Anubis (Cale), Rajura (Dais), and Naaza (Sekhmet) do not approve of. 

Tsuki takes place right after the episodes that involve Ryo using the Kikōtei against Saranbo, their latest enemy. The Troopers contemplate the possibility of Arago's return and Shū wishes for them to visit his family's restaurant in Yokohama. However, the others think it would be a waste of time and ultimately hurt his feelings. 

Later in the evening, Shū is late meeting up with the others. Gōgasha makes his appearance and proves to be a powerful opponent. As the Troopers struggle, Shū arrives on the scene and summons his armor. He proves to be more than enough for the demon and defeats him. Back in the Yōjakai, the three Mashō are actually grateful for Gōgasha's defeat. Fans learn of the respect the Mashō actually have for Shutendōji (Anubis) and how nobody can take his place, despite their differences.

See also
 Ronin Warriors

Drama audio recordings